= 1955–56 Plunket Shield season =

Cricket tournament in New Zealand

1955–56 Plunket Shield
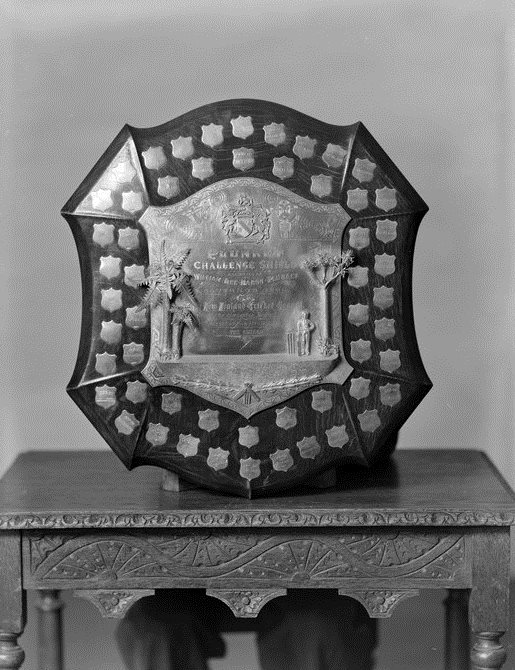
- The Plunket Shield trophy
- Cricket format: First-class
- Tournament format(s): Round-robin
- Champions: Canterbury (7th title)
- Participants: 5
- Matches: 10

The 1955–56 Plunket Shield season was a tournament of the Plunket Shield, the domestic first-class cricket competition of New Zealand.

Canterbury won the championship, finishing at the top of the points table at the end of the round-robin tournament between the five first-class sides, Auckland, Canterbury, Central Districts, Otago and Wellington. Eight points were awarded for a win, four points for having a first innings lead in a draw and two points for a first innings deficit in a draw.

== Table ==
Below are the Plunket Shield standings for the season:

Team	Played	Won	Lost	Drawn	Points	NetRpW
Canterbury	4	4	0	0	32	6.145
Auckland	4	2	1	1	18	-0.506
Central Districts	4	2	2	0	16	2.063
Wellington	4	1	2	1	12	1.529
Otago	4	0	4	0	0	-9.468
